The Yale Series of Younger Poets is an annual event of Yale University Press aiming to publish the debut collection of a promising American poet. Established in 1918, the Younger Poets Prize is the longest-running annual literary award in the United States.

Each year, the Younger Poets Competition accepts submissions from American poets who have not previously published a book of poetry. Once the judge has chosen a winner, the Press publishes a book-length manuscript of the winner's poetry as the next volume in the series. All poems must be original, and only one manuscript may be entered at a time.

Rules and eligibility
Contest requirements were first articulated in the summer of 1920. The series had already published four books, all written by Yale students, and the judges sought to attract a nationwide pool of applicants. A promotional statement gave the following, somewhat vague eligibility requirements: "Anyone is eligible provided he (or she) is young and comparatively unknown. The age limit is understood to be about thirty." A formal set of rules was adopted in 1924. In addition to specifying page limits and other manuscript requirements, these new rules limited the contest to American citizens younger than 30. However, current rules allow poets of any age who have not published a book of poetry to be considered. Although the contest was briefly opened to any writer of English-language poetry under Auden's judgeship, it has remained limited to American citizens ever since.

History

The Younger Poets Series was established in 1919 by Clarence Day, whose brother George Parmly Day had founded Yale University Press with his wife Wilhelmine in 1908. The competition's first judge, Charlton Miner Lewis, was a prominent professor in Yale's English department. The inaugural competition took place after the end of World War I, just as an influx of young veterans returned from fighting in Europe and entered college. Modernist poetry emerged in this period, but early entries in the series reflected the neoclassical tastes of the older generation adjudicating the competition, all men who had received degrees from Yale in the late-19th century. The anglophilic publishers were heavily influenced by English poetry, especially the contemporary Georgian poetry, and the competition itself was directly influenced by the similar "Adventures All" poetry series of Oxford University Press.

The contest solidified its importance in American literature under the judgeship of Stephen Vincent Benét. Benet was judge from 1933 to 1942, followed by Archibald MacLeish from 1944 to 1946. Margaret Walker's For My People was the last volume selected by Benet. Auden assumed the judgeship after MacLeish. The contest is regarded by some to have been at its height from 1947 to 1959, when W. H. Auden was choosing the winners. His then-young poets included Adrienne Rich, James Wright, W. S. Merwin, John Ashbery, and John Hollander.  The period was also notable for the two-time refusal of Sylvia Plath's manuscript Two Lovers, and Colossus which was subsequently published in England. The 1969–1977 period, overseen by Stanley Kunitz, included volumes by Carolyn Forché and Robert Hass; Hass later became the Poet Laureate of the United States. The judgeship of W. S. Merwin, from 1998 to 2003, was fraught with controversy, as he refused to select a winner the first year that he was judge. Louise Glück, who is widely considered to have revived the prize's stature, judged the award from 2003 to 2010. Rae Armantrout is the current judge.

Judges

Past winners
The year column provides the date of the competition. The winning poetry collections are published the following year.

See also
American poetry
List of poetry awards
List of literary awards
List of years in poetry
List of years in literature

References

Citations

Sources

External links
 Official website

American poetry awards
Awards established in 1918
Publications established in 1919
1918 establishments in Connecticut
Yale University Press books
Yale